is a professional Japanese baseball player. He plays catcher for the Yokohama DeNA BayStars.

External links

 NPB.com

1990 births
Living people
Baseball people from Kagoshima Prefecture
Komazawa University alumni
Japanese baseball players
Nippon Professional Baseball catchers
Yokohama DeNA BayStars players